David Solans Cortés (born 3 August 1996) is a Spanish film and television actor.

Biography
Solans' film debut was with Jesús Monllaó, who gave him the opportunity to participate in the film Son of Cain, where he played Nico, a psychopathic boy obsessed with chess.

In the following years, he played the protagonist in the web series directed by Marc and Oriol Puig, La caida de Apolo, and in the feature film El dulce sabor de limón by David Aymerich.

His first appearance on the small screen was in the series Bajo sospecha of Antena 3, where he played Oscar in the first season of the series.

In 2015, he starred in the TV series Merlí from TV3, where he plays Bruno Bergeron, a student who finds it difficult to accept himself how he is, and whose father becomes his new philosophy teacher. Due to the grand acclaim the series received in the Catalan public, La Sexta decided to dub the series in Castilian for the whole country. In 2016, the second season of Merlí aired. He left the series after the 12th episode, one episode before the season ended.

That year, he also began a four-episode mini-series on Telecinco, Lo que escondían sus ojos, playing Ramón Serrano Suñer.

Filmography

Television
 2015: Bajo sospecha, as Óscar Vidal
 2015–2016: Merlí, as Bruno Bergeron (episodes 1–26)
 2016: Lo que escondían sus ojos, as Ramón Serrano-Suñer Polo
 2018: El Punto Frío, as Martín
 2018: Boca Norte, as Daniel
 2019: La caza. Monteperdido, as Quim
 2019: Días de Navidad, as Juan
 2019: Merlí: Sapere Aude, as Bruno
 2022: Heirs to the Land, as young Hugo Llor
 2022: The Longest Night, as Javi

Film
 2013: Hijo de Caín, as Nico
 2013: La caída de Apolo, as Max
 2017: El dulce sabor del limón, as Jaume

Theater
 2017: A cada rey su merecido, as Zarek

Awards and nominations

In 2014, he was nominated by the Catalan Academy of Cinema (along with José Sacristán, Javier Cámara y Eduard Fernández) and the Círculo de Escritores Cinematográficos for his role in Hijo de Caín, and won Best Actor at Girona Film Festival for his performance in La caída de Apolo.

References

External links
 

Male actors from Barcelona
Male film actors from Catalonia
Male television actors from Catalonia
1996 births
Living people
21st-century Spanish male actors